Wells Street is a major north–south street in Chicago. It is officially designated as 200 West, and is named in honor of William Wells, a United States Army Captain who died in the Battle of Fort Dearborn. Between 1870 and 1912, it was named 5th Avenue so as not to tarnish the name of Wells during a period when the street had a bad reputation.

Wells Street is interrupted by Guaranteed Rate Field, Interstate 55, and Lincoln Park.  Wells Street crosses the Chicago River at the Wells Street Bridge.

Some downtown blocks of Wells Street are located beneath the Chicago 'L' train system. The first Crate & Barrel store, which opened in 1962, was located on Wells Street.

Wells Street was named in Time Magazine's 1976 article "The Porno Plague".

Old Town Neighborhood
Wells Street on the north side often refers to a strip of retail shops, bars and restaurants in the Old Town neighborhood in the Near North neighborhood.

Intersections
This only shows part of Wells Street between the North Side and the Loop.

References 

Streets in Chicago